Hold the Girl is the second studio album by Japanese-British singer Rina Sawayama. It was released on 16 September 2022 by Dirty Hit. The lead single from the album, entitled "This Hell", was released on 18 May 2022. The album, recorded between 2020 and 2021, features production from collaborators including Paul Epworth, Clarence Clarity, Stuart Price, and Marcus Andersson. Clarence Clarity also produced much of Sawayama's debut album Sawayama (2020).

Composition 
Sawayama has named Kelly Clarkson, the Corrs, Paramore, and Sugababes as artists who influenced Hold the Girl, as well as Taylor Swift's 2020 album Folklore. Variety Thania Garcia described Hold the Girl as "an evolution in [Sawayama's] style that will meld influences from across the pop spectrum".

Musically, Hold the Girl is produced, performed, and recorded in a wide variety of genres. Primarily a pop record, specifically styled under the dance-pop and alternative pop subgenres. it also contains elements of 1990s alternative rock, pop rock, soft rock, Europop, trance, industrial, country pop, hi-NRG, pop punk, Eurotrance, stadium rock, Britpop, disco, R&B, hyperpop, J-pop, house, Eurodance, electronic, UK garage, techno, folk and psychedelic music.

Songs
The album's lead single "This Hell", a country pop song with "glam rock riffs", was called a "thrilling empowerment anthem" by Paste Jade Gomez, who suggested its first lyric, "Let's go girls", nods Shania Twain's similar introduction in her 1999 song "Man! I Feel Like a Woman!". The author affirmed that the song introduces Sawayama's approach on country music. Sawayama reflected that the genre "represents comfort, brilliant storytelling and authentic expression of the writer's reality"; she dubbed the song "euphoric and tongue-in-cheek". She worked with Paul Epworth in "This Hell", a collaboration she had "dream[ed]" of doing, and they finished the track in one day. According to Sawayama, the track was written as a response to "human rights that are being taken away from minorities at a rapid rate in the name of traditional religious beliefs", particularly the rights of the LGBT community; Sawayama stated: "When the world tells us we don't deserve love and protection, we have no choice but to give love and protection to each other. This hell is better with you". The song references gay icons, namely Britney Spears, Whitney Houston and Diana, Princess of Wales, and criticises the paparazzi's "cruelty" towards them.

Writing for Rolling Stone UK, Hannah Ewens stated that the album's title track presents Sawayama singing with 2000s R&B vocals and "opens like a holy gesture to Madonna's 'Like a Prayer' and becomes an emotional dancefloor filler". Rob Sheffield of the American edition of the same publication likened the track to Lady Gaga. The author described "Catch Me in the Air" as a celebration of Sawayama's relationship with her mother, written like a "Corrs song as if pitched to Gwen Stefani". The singer herself stated that she "wanted to write about this weird relationship with single parents. You do catch each other in the air". The seventh track, "Your Age", is a "mix of bhangra and electro-warp sound effects". The ninth track, "Frankenstein" is a "tense and tetchy indie track featuring the singer begging someone to therapise her, to 'put me together, make me better'", and featuring a "digital 'hey, hey, hey' chant halfway between AC/DC and the Village People".

Promotion 
Before an official announcement, Sawayama's second record was listed among the most anticipated albums of 2022 by Stereogum and DIY. In May 2022, Sawayama began advertising a forthcoming release through social media content and pamphlets with "blood-red" background and the text "Rina is going to hell" in all caps. The same month, she released lead single "This Hell" and announced Hold the Girl, a release date of 2 September and an accompanying tour beginning on 12 October. Following the announcement, the album was named one of Vulture's "36 Albums We Can't Wait to Hear This Summer".

The singer performed "This Hell" in The Tonight Show Starring Jimmy Fallon on 19 May and during the BBC Radio 1's Big Weekend on 29 May. A music video for the song, directed by Ali Kurr, premiered on 15 June. A second single, "Catch Me in the Air", was issued on 27 June. The album's title track was released as the third single on 27 July; the same day, she announced that the album was pushed back to 16 September due to "production issues" and that a fourth single would be made available before the date. Kurr also directed the music video for "Hold the Girl", which was released on 3 August. The fourth single, "Phantom", was released on 25 August. The fifth single, "Hurricanes", was released on 12 September, four days before the album's release.

Tour 

The Hold the Girl Tour was the third concert tour by Rina Sawayama, launched in support of the album. The tour began in Glasgow on 12 October 2022 and concluded on 27 February 2023 in Oslo after 5 legs.

Cancelled dates

Setlist 
After Send My Love to John, Sawayama performed a cover, which was different at every show.

 Minor Feelings
 Hold the Girl
 Catch Me in the Air
 Hurricanes
 Your Age
 Imagining
 STFU!
 Frankenstein
 Holy (Till You Let Me Go)
 Bad Friend
 Send My Love to John
 Phantom
 To Be Alive
 Lucid
 Beg for You
 Comme des Garçons (Like the Boys)
 XS
 This Hell (encore)

Reception

Hold the Girl received critical acclaim upon its release. At Metacritic, which assigns a normalised rating out of 100 based on reviews from mainstream critics, the album received a score of 84 out of 100, based on reviews from 20 critics, indicating "universal acclaim". The album was rated an 8.1 out of 10 on the aggregator AnyDecentMusic?.

Reviewing the album for AllMusic, Neil Z. Yeung called it "one of those albums where each of the vastly different songs could be a hit and, no matter how many times it's been spun, a moment of pause is needed to fully absorb just how good it really is," and claimed it as, "the sound of an artist taking their rightful place on the pop throne." Writing for Pitchfork, Cat Zhang called the album "decidedly more earnest and weighty" than its predecessor and likened it to "an attempt to merge the full-throated spectacle of Born This Way with the surviving-through-trauma emotionality of Chromatica". Zhang additionally opined that the myriad of "genre mash-ups and key changes" mean that "almost every song strives to be Sawayama's 'Bohemian Rhapsody'" but the album's "constant pivots make it hard to track its central concept: revisiting and empathizing with a younger self".

Hannah Mylrea of NME called the record "the best British pop album of the year", complimenting Sawayama's "laser-precision melodies and hooks", "distinctive lyricism" and "impressive level of intimacy" in spite of the "high-octane" tracklist.

Commercial performance
Hold the Girl debuted at number three on the UK Albums Chart; the highest-charting album by a Japanese-born solo artist in the history of the chart, and Sawayama's highest-charting album to date, with sales of 13,961 (of which 7,148 were vinyl copies). In the United States, the album debuted at number 166 on the US Billboard 200 making it her first entry on the chart.

Track listing

Notes
  signifies an additional producer
 All tracks vocal produced by Cameron Gower Poole.
 "Minor Feelings" contains a sample from 2019 British film Rocks.

Personnel

Musicians
Rina Sawayama – vocals, programming
Clarence Clarity – synthesizer, guitar, programming
Paul Epworth – synthesizer, drum programming
Vixen Jamieson – guitar
Matt Tong — drums on "Frankenstein"

Technical
Rina Sawayama - executive production
Clarence Clarity – production
Paul Epworth – production
Riley MacIntyre – engineering
Cameron Gower Poole – engineering, vocal production
Evie Clark-Yospa – engineering
Jonathan Gilmore – engineering
Joseph Rodgers – engineering
Stuart Price – production
Robin Schmidt – mastering
Geoff Swan – mixing

Artwork
 Chester Lockhart – creative direction, design, layout
 Samuel Burgess-Johnson – design, layout
 Thurstan Redding – photography

Charts

Release history

Notes

References

2022 albums
Rina Sawayama albums
Albums produced by Clarence Clarity
Albums produced by Paul Epworth
Albums produced by Stuart Price
Dirty Hit albums